One Night Apart is a 1950 West German period comedy film directed by Hans Deppe and starring Kurt Seifert, Olga Tschechowa and Sonja Ziemann. It was shot at the Tempelhof Studios in Berlin. The film's sets were designed by the art director Gabriel Pellon.

Synopsis
In Berlin during pre-First World War era, a highly respectable figure arrives with his friend for a conference on public morality. However he quickly loses his head over a nightclub singer he encounters. His wife, concerned about her husband's welfare, arrives in the city soon afterwards.

Cast
 Kurt Seifert as Heinrich Pogge
 Olga Tschechowa as Vera, seine Frau
 Sonja Ziemann as Käthe
 Gretl Schörg as Musette, Sängerin
 Paul Hörbiger as Ferdinand Graf Lilienstein
 Georg Thomalla as Udo
 Rudolf Schündler as Tobias Nickelmann
 Ernst Waldow as Bocknagel, Polizeirat
 Gerd Frickhöffer
 Martha Hübner as Anna, Dienstmädchen
 Otto Falvay as Tom Sylvester
 Erika von Thellmann as Amalie Eusebie
 Charlotta Bönstedt
 Franz Schafheitlin as Bürgermeister
 Edith Karin as Vorsteherin des Amalienstifts
 Franz-Otto Krüger as Herr Schlüsemann

See also
 The True Jacob (1931)
 Oh, Daddy! (1935)
 The True Jacob (1960)

References

Bibliography 
 Willi Höfig. Der deutsche Heimatfilm 1947–1960. 1973.

External links 
 

1950 films
1950 comedy films
West German films
1950s German-language films
Films directed by Hans Deppe
Gloria Film films
Films shot at Tempelhof Studios
German films based on plays
Remakes of German films
German black-and-white films
1950s German films
Films set in the 1910s
German historical comedy films
1950s historical comedy films
Films set in Berlin